Lulu City was a transient mining town in eastern Grand County, Colorado, in the Kawuneeche Valley in what is now Rocky Mountain National Park. The town appeared after silver was discovered in the area in 1879 by prospector Joe Shipler,  and was built primarily by the Middle Park and Grand River Land Improvement Company in 1880. The company was backed by Benjamin F. Burnett of Fort Collins and Fort Collins rancher William Baker. The town was named after Burnett's daughter. By 1881, there were forty cabins and a number of business establishments.  By this time it was apparent that the silver ore was of low grade, and that high transportation costs made mining in the area marginal, and the town began its decline. It was abandoned by 1885, except by Shipler, who lived there for thirty years.

The settlement of Dutchtown was established in the Never Summer Mountains to the west of town by outcasts from Lulu City.

The land was purchased from the estate of Hugh J. Harrison by the National Park Service in 1949. Three cabin ruins remain, along with remnants of other structures. The site was placed on the National Register of Historic Places on September 14, 1977.

See also
National Register of Historic Places listings in Grand County, Colorado

References

National Register of Historic Places in Rocky Mountain National Park
Ghost towns in Colorado
Buildings and structures in Grand County, Colorado
Former populated places in Grand County, Colorado
Populated places on the National Register of Historic Places in Colorado
1879 establishments in Colorado
Populated places established in 1879
1884 disestablishments in Colorado
Populated places disestablished in 1884